Too Late to Cry may refer to:

 Too Late to Cry (Widowmaker album), 1977 
 Too Late to Cry (Alison Krauss album), 1987